Park Towers by the Sea are a set of four residential highrise buildings in Tijuana, Baja California, Mexico. Located in the Playas de Tijuana area of the city, Park Towers are the first prominent fixtures on the metropolitan Tijuana coastline north of Rosarito Beach. Upon completion of the first tower, the complex became the 10th tallest buildings in the city.

History
Park Towers were developed as a luxury residence.

Design
The towers are residential buildings with a modern style. They are composed primarily of glass and reinforced concrete.

See also
 List of tallest buildings in Tijuana

References

External links
 Park Towers by the Sea
 

Skyscrapers in Tijuana
Residential skyscrapers in Mexico